The Wam language may refer to:

Kugama language (also known as Wam or Wã̀m), spoken in eastern Nigeria
Wom language (Papua New Guinea) (also known as Wam), spoken in Papua New Guinea